Prince Karl or Karel or Carl may refer to:

People
Karl I, Prince of Anhalt-Zerbst (1534–1561)
Charles IX of Sweden (1550–1611)
Karl I, Prince of Liechtenstein (1569–1627)
Karl Eusebius, Prince of Liechtenstein (1611–1684)
Charles I Louis, Elector Palatine (1617–1680)
Karl, Prince of Anhalt-Zerbst (1652–1718)
Karl Frederick, Prince of Anhalt-Bernburg (1668–1721)
Karl August, Prince of Waldeck and Pyrmont (1704–1763)
Charles Louis, Prince of Anhalt-Bernburg-Schaumburg-Hoym (1723–1806)
Karl Friedrich Wilhelm, Prince of Leiningen (1724–1807)
Prince Karl Anton August of Schleswig-Holstein-Sonderburg-Beck (1727–1759)
Prince Karl Borromäus of Liechtenstein (1730–1789)
Karl George Lebrecht, Prince of Anhalt-Köthen (1730–1789)
Charles of Saxony, Duke of Courland  (1733–1796)
Karl Anselm, 4th Prince of Thurn and Taxis  (1733–1805)
Charles Christian, Prince of Nassau-Weilburg (1735–1788)
Charles-Joseph, 7th Prince of Ligne (1735–1814)
Charles XIII of Sweden (1748–1818)
Karl August von Hardenberg (1750–1822)
Charles Eugene, Prince of Lambesc (1751–1825)
Charles Louis, Hereditary Prince of Baden (1755–1801)
Karl Alois, Prince Lichnowsky (1761–1814)
Charles XIV John of Sweden (1763–1844)
Karl Philipp von Wrede (1767–1838)
Karl Alexander, 5th Prince of Thurn and Taxis (1770–1827)
Karl Philipp, Prince of Schwarzenberg (1771–1820)
Karl, Prince of Hohenzollern-Sigmaringen (1785–1853)
Charles, Grand Duke of Baden (1786–1818)
Prince Karl Theodor of Bavaria (1795–1875)
Prince Charles of Prussia (1801–1883)
Prince Karl Johann of Liechtenstein (1803–1871)
Karl, Prince of Leiningen (1804–1856) (1804–1856)
Prince Charles of Hesse and by Rhine (1809–1877)
Karl Anton, Prince of Hohenzollern (1811–1885)
Prince Carl of Solms-Braunfels (1812–1875)
Prince Karl of Auersperg (1814–1890)
Charles XV of Sweden (1826–1872)
Carl Ludwig II, Prince of Hohenlohe-Langenburg (1829–1907)
Charles Gonthier, Prince of Schwarzburg-Sondershausen (1830–1909)
Archduke Karl Salvator of Austria (1839–1892)
Carol I of Romania (1839–1914)
Prince Carl Oscar, Duke of Södermanland (1852–1854)
Karl, 8th Prince Kinsky of Wchinitz and Tettau (1858–1919)
Karl Max, Prince Lichnowsky  (1860–1928)
Prince Carl, Duke of Västergötland (1861–1951)
Prince Karl Anton of Hohenzollern  (1868–1919)
Haakon VII of Norway (1872–1957)
Prince Karl of Bavaria (1874–1927)
Charles Edward, Duke of Saxe-Coburg and Gotha (1884–1954)
Charles I of Austria (1887–1922)
Karl, Prince of Leiningen (1898–1946) (1898–1946)
Karl August, 10th Prince of Thurn and Taxis (1898–1982)
Karl Gero, Duke of Urach (1899–1981)
Prince Charles, Count of Flanders (1903–1983)
Archduke Karl Pius of Austria, Prince of Tuscany (1909–1953)
Prince Carl Bernadotte (1911–2003)
Carol Victor, Hereditary Prince of Albania (1913–1973)
Prince Karl Franz of Prussia (1916–1975)
Count Carl Johan Bernadotte of Wisborg (1916–2012)
Prince Karl of Leiningen (1928–1990)
Karel Schwarzenberg (born 1937)
Carl XVI Gustaf of Sweden (born 1946)
Prince Karl Emich of Leiningen (born 1952)
Karl Friedrich, Prince of Hohenzollern (born 1952)
Karl Anselm, Duke of Urach (born 1955)
Archduke Karl of Austria (born 1961)
Karl, 12th Prince Kinsky of Wchinitz and Tettau (born 1967)
Prince Carl Philip, Duke of Värmland (born 1979)

Other
Prince Karl (play), an 1886 play by A. C. Gunter

See also
Carl of Sweden (disambiguation)
Prince Carlos (disambiguation)
Prince Charles (disambiguation)